Ramiro Blacut Rodriguez (born 3 January 1944 in La Paz) is a Bolivian former international footballer. He was a member of the Bolivian team that won the 1963 South American Championship.

Career
During his career, he represented Club Bolívar and The Strongest as well as Argentine club Ferro Carril Oeste from 1963 to 1965. In addition, in 1965-66 he played with Bayern Munich. He earned 23 caps for Bolivia, scoring 3 goals.

References

External links

1944 births
Living people
Footballers from La Paz
Bolivian footballers
Bolivia international footballers
Copa América-winning players
Club Bolívar players
Ferro Carril Oeste footballers
FC Bayern Munich footballers
FBC Melgar footballers
The Strongest players
Bundesliga players
Bolivian expatriate footballers
Expatriate footballers in Argentina
Bolivian expatriate sportspeople in Argentina
Expatriate footballers in Germany
Bolivian expatriate sportspeople in Germany
Expatriate footballers in Peru
Bolivian football managers
Club Bolívar managers
Bolivia national football team managers
The Strongest managers
Club Blooming managers
C.D. Jorge Wilstermann managers
S.D. Aucas managers
C.D. El Nacional managers
C.D. Cuenca managers
Oriente Petrolero managers
1979 Copa América managers
1991 Copa América managers
2004 Copa América managers
Expatriate football managers in Ecuador
Association football forwards
Bolivian expatriate football managers
Real Santa Cruz managers